The 2021–22 Liga IV was the 80th season of the Liga IV, the fourth tier of the Romanian football league system. The champions of each county association play against one from a neighboring county in a play-off to gain promotion. The counties were divided into seven regions, each consisting of six counties and the draw was made on 24 February 2022.

Promotion play-off 
The matches are scheduled to be played on 18 and 25 June 2022.

|-
|colspan="3" style="background-color:#97DEFF"|Region 1 (North-East)
|colspan="2" style="background-color:#97DEFF"|
||5–0||1–4
||0–0||0–1
||3–3||3–4
|-
|colspan="3" style="background-color:#97DEFF"|Region 2 (North-West)
|colspan="2" style="background-color:#97DEFF"|
||0–3||0–2
||w/o||w/o
||1–1||0–3
|-
|colspan="3" style="background-color:#97DEFF"|Region 3 (Center)
|colspan="2" style="background-color:#97DEFF"|
||4–1||6–3
||1–1||2–1
||11–2||7–1
|-
|colspan="3" style="background-color:#97DEFF"|Region 4 (West)
|colspan="2" style="background-color:#97DEFF"|
||2–0||2–0
||5–0||6–2
||4–1||0–0
|-
|colspan="3" style="background-color:#97DEFF"|Region 5 (South-West)
|colspan="2" style="background-color:#97DEFF"|
{{OneLegResult| Oltul Curtișoara (OT) ||3–3  | (VL) Cozia Călimănești }}||3–1||0–2  
||1–0||1–1
||1–1||0–1
|-
|colspan="3" style="background-color:#97DEFF"|Region 6 (South)
|colspan="2" style="background-color:#97DEFF"|
||3–2||1–3
||0–1||3–1
{{OneLegResult| Venus Independența (CL) ||2–4| (B) CS Dinamo București  }}||2–3||0–1
|-
|colspan="3" style="background-color:#97DEFF"|Region 7 (South-East)
|colspan="2" style="background-color:#97DEFF"|
||5–2||0–1
||2–1||0–4
||w/o||w/o
|}

County leagues

Alba County

Arad County 

Championship play-off 
The Championship play-off will be played in a double round-robin tournament between the best four teams of the regular season. The teams will started the play-off with half of the points accumulated in the first stage of the season.

 Championship play-out 
The Championship play-out will be played in a single round-robin tournament between the teams ranked 5-10 in the regular season. The teams will started the play-out with half of the points accumulated in the first stage of the season.

Argeș County

Bacău County 
 Seria 1

Seria 2 

Championship play-off 
The first two teams in each series of the regular season will meet once (3 matches per team). The teams start the Championship play-off with the points from the regular season accumulated with the teams ranked 1-9.

 Relegation play-out 
The teams ranked 8th will play with the teams ranked 9th in the other series in a one leg relegation play-out match.

Bihor County 
Seria 1 (North)

Seria 2 (South)

Championship play-off 
The Championship play-off will be played between the first two teams from each series of the regular season in a double round-robin tournament and with no records from the regular season.

Relegation play-out 
The teams ranked 3-8 in each series will play another round (5 matches) while maintaining the accumulated records.
Seria 1 (North)

Seria 2 (South)

Bistrița-Năsăud County 

 Championship play-off 
Championship play-off played in a single round-robin tournament between the best four teams of the regular season. The teams start the Championship play-off with the points and goal difference accumulated in the Regular season.

Botoșani County

Brașov County

Brăila County 

Championship play-off 
In the championship play-off each team plays every other team twice. Teams start the play-off round with their points from the Regular season halved, rounded upwards, and no other records carried over from the Regular season.

Championship play-out 
In the championship play-out each team plays every other team twice. Teams start the play-out round with their points from the Regular season halved, rounded upwards, and no other records carried over from the Regular season.

Bucharest 

Championship play-off 
Championship play-off played in a single round-robin tournament between the best four teams of the regular season. Depending on the place occupied in the Regular season, the teams started the play-off with the following points: 1st place – 3 points, 2nd place – 2 points, 3rd place – 1 point, 4th place – 0 points.

Buzău County 
Seria 1

Seria 2

Championship play-off 
The Championship play-off will be played between the best four teams from each series of the regular season. Depending on the place occupied in the regular season, the teams started the play-off with the following points: 1st place - 3 points, 2nd place - 2 points, 3rd place - 1 point, 4th place - 0 points.

Relegation play-out 
Depending on the place occupied in the regular season, the teams started the play-out with the following points: 5th place - 5 points, 6th place - 3 points, 7th place - 2 points, 8th place - 1 point, 9th place - 0 points.

Caraș-Severin County

Călărași County 
Seria A

Seria B

Championship play-off 
The teams started the play-off with all the records from the Regular season.
Seria A 

Seria B 

Relegation play-out 
The teams started the play-out with all the records from the Regular season.
Seria A 

Seria B 

Championship final 

Venus Independența won the 2021–22 Liga IV Călărași County and qualify to promotion play-off in Liga III.

Cluj County

Constanța County

Covasna County 
Each team plays every other team once.

Dâmbovița County

Dolj County

Galați County

Giurgiu County 
South Series

North Series

Championship play-off 
The championship play-off was played between the best two ranked teams in each series of the Regular season. All matches was played at Marin Anastasovici Stadium in Giurgiu on 7 and 8 June 2022 the semi-finals and on 11 June 2022 the final.
Semi-finals

Final

Victoria Adunații-Copăceni won the 2021–22 Liga IV Giurgiu County and qualify to promotion play-off in Liga III.

Gorj County 

 Championship play-off 
The Championship play-off will be played in a double round-robin tournament between the first four teams of the regular season maintaining the accumulated records.

Harghita County

Hunedoara County 

Championship play-off
Final four 
The final four will be played in a double round-robin tournament between the best four teams of the regular season. The teams started the final four play-off with half of the points accumulated in the regular season.

5–7 place play-off 
The teams started the play-off with half of the points accumulated in the regular season.

8–10 place play-off 
The teams started the play-off with half of the points accumulated in the regular season.

Ialomița County

Iași County

Ilfov County 
Seria 1

Seria 2

Championship play-off 
The Championship play-off will be played between the first two teams from each series of the regular season. The semi-finals and the final would be played in a double-leg format.
Semi-finals
The first legs will be played on 28 May, and the second legs will be played on 1 June 2022.

||5–3||5–2
||3–1||0–3

Final
The first legs will be played on 8 June, and the second legs will be played on 11 June 2022.

||4–3||2–5

Glina won the 2021–22 Liga IV Ilfov County and qualify to promotion play-off in Liga III.

Maramureș County 
South Series

North Series

Final four 
Semi-finals
The first legs was played on 28 and 29 May, and the second legs was played on 4 and 5 June 2022.

||0–2||0–8
||1–1||1–7

Final
The championship final was played on 11 June 2022 at Viorel Mateianu Stadium in Baia Mare.

Sighetu Marmației won the 2021–22 Liga IV Maramureș County and qualify to promotion play-off in Liga III.

Mehedinți County

Mureș County 
Regular season
Series 1

Series 2

Championship play-off 
In the championship play-off each team plays every other team once. Depending on the place occupied in the regular season, the teams started the play-off with the following points: 1st place – 3 points, 2nd place – 2 points, 3rd place – 1 point, 4th place – 0 points.

Championship play-out 
In the championship play-out each team plays every other team once. Depending on the place occupied in the regular season, the teams started the play-out with the following points: 5th place – 4 points, 6th place – 3 points, 7th place – 2 points, 8th place – 1 point, 9th place – 0 points.

Neamț County

Olt County

Prahova County

Satu Mare County 
Series A

 Series B

Championship play-off 
The Championship play-off will be played in a single round-robin tournament between the best four teams from each series of the regular season. Teams will start the play-off with the following points: 1st place – 3 points, 2nd place – 2 points, 3rd place – 1 point, 4th place – 0 points.

Relegation play-out 
The Relegation play-out will be played in a single round-robin tournament between the last four teams from each series of the regular season. Teams will start the play-out with the following points: 5th place – 3 points, 6th place – 2 points, 7th place – 1 point, 8th place – 0 points.

Sălaj County 

Championship play-off 
The best four teams from the Regular season qualify for the championship play-off. The play-off consist in a single round-robin schedule and the teams carried all records from the Regular season.

Sibiu County 

Championship play-off 
In the championship play-off each team plays every other team twice. Teams start the play-off round with their points from the Regular season halved, rounded upwards, and no other records carried over from the Regular season.

Relegation play-off 
In the relegation play-off each team plays every other team once. Teams start the play-out round with their points from the Regular season halved, rounded upwards, and no other records carried over from the Regular season.

Suceava County 

Championship play-off 
The top four teams from Regular season will meet twice to contest the league. Teams started the Championship play-off with their points from the Regular season halved, rounded upwards, and no other records carried over from the Regular season.

Relegation play-out 
The bottom six teams from the regular season meet once with the other teams to contest against relegation. Teams started the Relegation play-out with their points from the Regular season halved, rounded upwards, and no other records carried over from the Regular season.

Teleorman County 
Seria I

Seria II

Championship play-off 
The Championship play-off played between the first four ranked teams in each series for the designation of the county champion. The quarter-finals, semi-finals and final would be played in a double-leg format.
 Quarter-finals
The first legs was played on 30 April, and the second legs was played on 7 May 2022.

||1–5||4–0
||5–1||0–2
||0–3||1–7
||7–0||4–0

Semi-finals
The first legs was played on 14 May, and the second legs was played on 21 May 2022.

||2–2||1–2
||6–0||1–0

Final
The first legs was played on 28 May, and the second legs on 4 June 2022.

||1–1||0–7

Dunărea Turris Turnu Măgurele won the 2021–22 Liga IV Teleorman County and qualify to promotion play-off in Liga III.

Timiș County

Tulcea County 
Seria A

Seria B

Championship play-off 
The championship play-off will be played in a double round-robin tournament between the winners of the qualifying round and the winner will be declared the county champion and representative of Tulcea County to promotion play-off in Liga III.
Qualifying round 
The first legs played on 22 April and the second legs played on 30 April 2022

||3–4||1–5
||2–2||3–0
||1–2||1–2
||1–5||0–3
|}
Play-off table

Vaslui County 

 Relegation play-out 
The 9th and 10th-placed teams of the Liga IV faces the 3rd and 4th-placed team of the Liga V Vaslui – County. The first leg was played on 11 and 12 June and the second leg on 19 June 2022.  

||3–1||2–3 
||3–5||6–2
|}

Vâlcea County

Vrancea County 
Group A

Group B

Championship play-off 
The results between the qualified teams will be maintained in the championship play-off, where eight round will be played, only with opponents from the another group.

Championship play-out

See also
 2021–22 Liga I
 2021–22 Liga II
 2021–22 Liga III

References

External links
 FRF
 frf-ajf.ro

Liga IV seasons
4
Romania